Siempre en Domingo (translated Always on Sunday) is a Mexican variety show created and hosted by Raúl Velasco. The show aired on Televisa from December 14, 1969 until April 19, 1998 when Velasco retired.

Siempre en Domingo became one of the most important, influential and popular TV shows in Latin America. Velasco's popular trademark, "patada de la suerte" (lucky kick), sponsored many artists that every Sunday performed in his popular TV show. Many English-speaking artists also performed on the show.

Notable artists
Artists who performed (many of which debuted) on the show include:

• Jose Luis Rodriguez El Puma  
 
 Selena
 Luis Miguel
 Soda Stereo
 Mecano
 Lynda Thomas
 Thalía
 Paulina Rubio
 Miguel Bosé
 Caifanes
 Alejandra Ávalos
 María Conchita Alonso
 Julio Iglesias
 Locomia
 Chayanne
 Ricky Martin
 José José
 Raphael
 Celia Cruz
 Timbiriche
 Juan Gabriel
 Maná
 Alejandra Guzmán
 Menudo
 Maldita Vecindad
 Onda Vaselina
 Fey
 Cristian Castro
 Laureano Brizuela
 Flans
 Emmanuel
 Alejandro Fernández
 Roberto Carlos
 Benny Ibarra
 Café Tacvba
 Kabah
 Moenia
 Eduardo Capetillo
 Erik Rubín
 Julieta Venegas
 Kairo
 Kenny y los Eléctricos
 Enrique Guzmán
 Sentidos Opuestos
 Gloria Trevi
 Secos & Molhados
 Mercurio
 Jeans
 Irán Castillo
 Jorge Muñiz
 Los Chamos
 Los Chicos
 Mocedades
 Ricchi e Poveri
 Miguel Ríos
 La Sonora Dinamita
 Marco Antonio Solís
 José María Napoleón
 Beatriz Adriana
 Angélica María
 Johnny Laboriel
 Lola Beltrán
 La Sonora Santanera
 César Costa
 Los Baby's
 Chico Che
 Joan Sebastián
 Verónica Castro
 Camilo Sesto
 Ana Gabriel
 Laura León
 Presuntos Implicados
 Amistades Peligrosas
 Fresas Con Crema
 Ricardo Montaner
 Lucía Méndez
 Vicente Fernández
 Manoella Torres
 Daniela Romo
 Lucero
 Manuel Mijares
 Pandora
 Daniela Mercury
 Pedro Fernández
 Tatiana
 Yuri
 Lorenzo Antonio
 El Tri
 Magneto
 Fandango
 Garibaldi
 Micro Chips
 Sasha Sokol
 Ritmo Peligroso
 Bronco
 Grupo Bryndis
 Los Ángeles Negros
 Pimpinela
 Amanda Miguel
 Diego Verdaguer
 Parchís
 Rocío Dúrcal
 Rocío Jurado
 Hombres G
 Charly García
 Alaska y Dinarama
 Enanitos Verdes
 Nacha Pop
 Franco De Vita
 Los Prisioneros
 Duncan Dhu
 Ricardo Arjona
 Mónica Naranjo
 Enrique Iglesias
 Shakira
 The Sacados
 Alejandro Sanz
 Marisela
 La Ley
 Laura Pausini
 Héroes Del Silencio
 Eros Ramazzotti
 Gloria Estefan
 H2O
 Fernando Villares

 Stephanie Salas

Notable non-Spanish acts

 Bee Gees
 ABBA
 Tina Turner
 David Lee Roth
 Whitney Houston
 Bryan Adams
 Sting
 Peter Cetera
 Richard Clayderman
 Richard Marx
 The Bangles
 Cyndi Lauper
 Olivia Newton-John
 Herb Alpert
 Barry Manilow
 Laura Branigan
 Gillette
 Village People
 Donna Summer
 Frankie Valli
 Shaun Cassidy
 Gloria Gaynor
 Sheena Easton
 Crowded House
 Boney M.
 KWS
 Spice Girls
 Sammy Davis Jr.
 Andy Gibb
 Jimmy Osmond
 Sabrina
 Level 42
 Jimmy Osmond
 The Outfield
 Linda Ronstadt
 Xuxa
 Barry Manilow
 Mireille Mathieu
 Nana Mouskouri
 Princess Stéphanie of Monaco

Cancellation
In 1998, Velasco was diagnosed with hepatitis C and needed a liver transplant. His health was becoming critical and was unable to continue hosting the show. Siempre en Domingo aired its last episode on April 19, 1998.

References

External links
 

Las Estrellas original programming
1969 Mexican television series debuts
1998 Mexican television series endings
1960s Mexican television series
1970s Mexican television series
1980s Mexican television series
1990s Mexican television series